Şah Sultan ("sovereign"; 21 April 1761 – 11 March 1803) was an Ottoman princess, the daughter of Sultan Mustafa III and one of his consort, Rifat Kadın or Fehime Kadın. She was the half sister of Sultan Selim III.

Early life
Şah Sultan was born on 21 April 1761 in the Topkapı Palace. Her father was Sultan Mustafa III, and her mother one of his consort, Rifat Kadın or Fehime Kadın (who died in childbirth in 1761). Instead, it has been discredited that her mother was Mihrişah Kadin, as it has been established that Şah was born only seven months before Mihrişah's certain son, Selim III.

On 24 April 1764, when Şah was three years old, her father betrothed her to the Grand Vizier Köse Bahir Mustafa Pasha. He was dismissed from his post and was killed in 1765.

On 2 January 1768, when Şah was seven years old, she was betrothed to Nişancı Yağlıkçızade Mehmed Emin Pasha. He became the Grand Vizier the same year, and was killed in 1769.

In 1774 Mustafa III died and Şah was relegated, together with her half-sisters and her father's consorts, to the Old Palace.

Marriage
On 6 November 1778, during the reign of her uncle Sultan Abdul Hamid I, when Şah was seventeen years old, she married vizier Nişançı Seyyid Mustafa Pasha. The wedding procession followed the bride to Cağaloğlu Palace, located on the Divanyolu street. The wedding reception took place the next day. The couple together had two biological daughters and an adopted one.

Şah Sultan may have suffered health problems because she lived in a villa by the sea and was significantly less active than her other two half-sisters, Beyhan Sultan and Hatice Sultan. Selim III often visited them, staying even for days and summoning the Grand Vizier there to discuss affairs of state.

Issue
By her marriage, Şah Sultan had two daughters: 
Şerife Havva Hanımsultan (1680 - six months after). Buried in Mustafa III's mausoleum. 
Aliye Hanımsultan (? - ?). Died around six months. Buried in Mustafa III's mausoleum. 

After her daughters death, she adopted one daughter:
New Hanim (? - ?). She died at 18.

Charities
In Tarih-i Cevdet it is claimed that Şah was an impeccable Muslim, who protected and helped the poor.

In 1792, the Şah Sultan commissioned a fountain near the Kasım Gönanî Mosque in Yeşildirek. In 1800, she commissioned her own mausoleum, a school, and another fountain near Zal Mahmud Pasha's mausoleum in Eyüp.

The facade of the complex is located on the street in the east direction.  There is a tomb with a small fountain on both sides on the left, a courtyard door to the right of the tomb, and a fountain with a median school on the far right.  The entire facade is made of marble except for the decorated section with a cut stone braid on the far left of the courtyard facade, a rectangular shaped door and three window openings with bite iron.  The courtyard door has a round arch.

Death
Şah Sultan died on 11 March 1803 in the Çağaloğlu Palace, and was buried in her own mausoleum located in Eyüp. Her husband outlived her by ten years dying in 1813.

Ancestry

References

Sources

 

1761 births
1803 deaths
Royalty from Istanbul
18th-century Ottoman princesses
19th-century Ottoman princesses